Kids Preferred is a manufacturer of children's toys located in East Windsor, New Jersey. The company was founded by Louis Premselaar in 1983 and has offices in New Jersey, Hong Kong and Shanghai.

In addition to their own brand of products, Kids Preferred has produced licensed toys for brands such as: The Tale of Peter Rabbit, Care Bears, Curious George, Disney, Goodnight Moon, Guess How Much I Love You, Llama Llama, Ryan's World, Rudolph the Red-Nosed Reindeer, and The World of Eric Carle products.

References 

Toy companies of the United States
1983 establishments in New Jersey
Companies based in New Jersey